Horfield is a locality in northern Victoria, Australia.

References

External links

Towns in Victoria (Australia)